Rina Takeda (born January 16, 1993) is a Japanese ice hockey player for Mikage Gretz and the Japanese national team. She participated at the 2015 IIHF Women's World Championship.

References

1993 births
Living people
Japanese women's ice hockey defencemen